The following highways are numbered 80:

International
 European route E80
 Arab Mashreq route M80

Australia
 Buchanan Highway
 Burleigh Connection Road - Queensland State Route 80
 M80 Ring Road, North East Link (under construction) (Melbourne)
 (South Australia)

Decommissioned Routes 
 - Monaro Highway (Now )

Belgium
 N80 road (Belgium)

Brazil
 BR-080

Canada
  Newfoundland and Labrador Route 80
  Saskatchewan Highway 80
  Winnipeg Route 80

China 
  G80 Expressway

France
 N80 road (France)

Germany
 Bundesstraße 80

India

Ireland
 N80 road (Ireland)

Israel
 Highway 80 (Israel)

Jordan

Korea, South
National Route 80

Kuwait
Highway 80 (Kuwait)

Mexico
 Mexican Federal Highway 80

New Zealand
 New Zealand State Highway 80

Philippines
 N80 highway (Philippines)

South Africa
 R80 road

Spain
 Autovía A-80
 Autovía CV-80

United Arab Emirates
D 80 road (United Arab Emirates)

United Kingdom
 A80 road (Scotland)
 M80 motorway

United States
 Interstate 80
 Interstate 80N (former; four highways)
 Interstate 80S (former; two highways)
 U.S. Route 80
 Arizona State Route 80
 Arkansas Highway 80
 California State Route 80 (1964) (former)
 Connecticut Route 80
 Florida State Road 80
 County Road 80A (Hendry County, Florida)
 Georgia State Route 80
 Hawaii Route 80
 Illinois Route 80 (former)
 K-80 (Kansas highway)
 Kentucky Route 80
 Maryland Route 80
Maryland Route 80A (former)
Maryland Route 80B (former)
Maryland Route 80C (former)
 Massachusetts Route 80
 M-80 (Michigan highway)
 Minnesota State Highway 80
 Missouri Route 80
Missouri Route 80 (1922) (former)
 Montana Highway 80
 Nebraska Highway 80 (former)
 Nebraska Link 80E
 Nebraska Link 80F
 Nebraska Link 80G
 Nebraska Link 80H
 Nebraska Spur 80B
 Nebraska Spur 80C
 Nebraska Spur 80D
 Nevada State Route 80 (former)
 County Route 80 (Bergen County, New Jersey)
 New Mexico State Road 80
 New York State Route 80
 County Route 80 (Dutchess County, New York)
 County Route 80 (Madison County, New York)
 County Route 80 (Montgomery County, New York)
 County Route 80 (Onondaga County, New York)
 County Route 80 (Rockland County, New York)
 County Route 80A (Rockland County, New York)
 County Route 80 (Saratoga County, New York)
 County Route 80 (Schenectady County, New York)
 County Route 80 (Suffolk County, New York)
 County Route 80A (Westchester County, New York)
 North Carolina Highway 80
 Ohio State Route 80 (former)
 Oklahoma State Highway 80
 Oklahoma State Highway 80A
 Pennsylvania Route 80 (former)
 South Carolina Highway 80
 Tennessee State Route 80
 Texas State Highway 80
 Texas State Highway Spur 80
 Farm to Market Road 80
 Utah State Route 80 (1935–1977) (former)
 Virginia State Route 80
 West Virginia Route 80
 Wisconsin Highway 80

Territories
 U.S. Virgin Islands Highway 80

See also
A80